Juan Antonio Bolea Foradada (30 March 1930 – 27 February 2021) was a Spanish politician who served as a Deputy and the first president of Aragón, playing a key role in the Spanish transition to democracy in that region.

References

1930 births
2021 deaths
Spanish politicians